Peter Franquart (born 4 January 1985) is a French former professional footballer who played as a defender.

Career
Franquart began his career 1997 with OSC Lille and played 92 games with 4 goals for the reserve, before being promoted to first team 2004. He played his first game on 20 August 2005 against Sochaux. On 8 January 2009, he was loaned out from Lille to play for Le Havre AC. He returned to Lille in summer 2009. On 28 August 2009, Franquart signed for Belgian club R. Charleroi S.C. on loan for one season.

External links
 
 
 
 Profile at FFF

References

1985 births
Living people
French footballers
Association football midfielders
Association football defenders
France under-21 international footballers
Ligue 1 players
Ligue 2 players
Belgian Pro League players
Lille OSC players
Le Havre AC players
R. Charleroi S.C. players
R.A.E.C. Mons players
R.E. Virton players
French expatriate footballers
French expatriate sportspeople in Belgium
Expatriate footballers in Belgium